Top Chef Thailand (season 1) is the first season of the Thai reality television series Top Chef Thailand. The season premiered on March 25, 2017, and concluded on June 24, 2017. Filming initially took place in Bangkok. Willment Leong, Suphamongkhon Suppipat, Thidid Tadsanakajon and Phichaya Uthantam served as judges and Pitipat Kutragule as a host for the first season.

The winner of the competition was "Chef Tam" Chudaree Debhakam, and the runners-up was "Chef May" Phattanant Thongthong.

Contestants
(ages stated are at start of filming)

Episodes

Episode 1
Quickfire Challenge 
The chefs prepare 5 ingredients include, separate 24 egg yolks, sliced 8 onions, chop 3 chickens, shuck 6 oysters, and fillet 5 sharptooth snappers.
{| class="wikitable"
|+Quickfire Challenge Results
|-
!Result
!Teams
!Contestants
|-
| align="center" style="background:limegreen;"|WIN
|Team Green
|Chef Hooto, Chef Max, Chef Nam Fon, Chef Ton, Chef Gig
|-
| align="center"| IN
|Team Orange
|Chef Nui, Chef Tam, Chef Ooy, Chef Folk, Chef Tu
|-
| align="center" style="background:tomato;"|LOW
|Team Blue
|Chef Tui, Chef Pong, Chef Bus, Chef Pete, Chef May
|}

Sudden-Death Quickfire Challenge 
The two lowest chefs create a dish with the ingredients from last round. 
{| class="wikitable"
|+Results
|-
!Result
!Contestant
|-
| align="center"| IN
|Chef Pong
|-
| align="center" style="background:lightgrey;"|OUT
|Chef Pete
|}

Elimination Challenge
The chefs create a dish with the ingredients from last round.
{| class="wikitable"
|+Elimination Challenge Results
|-
!Result
!Teams
!Contestants
|-
| align="center" style="background:limegreen;"|WIN
|Team Blue
|Chef Ooy, Chef Tam
|-
| align="center" style="background:cornflowerblue;"|HIGH
|Team Orange
|Chef Nam Fon, Chef Max
|-
| align="center" |IN
|Team Grey
|Chef Hooto, Chef Gig
|-
| align="center" |IN
|Team Brown
|Chef Ton, Chef May
|-
| align="center" |IN
|Team Black
|Chef Bus, Chef Tui
|-
| align="center" style="background:tomato;"|LOW
|Team Red
|Chef Pong, Chef Folk
|-
| align="center" style="background:tomato;"|LOW
|Team Green
|Chef Tu, Chef Nui
|}

Episode 2
Quickfire Challenge 
The chefs create a dish in one spoon and use the microwave only. The winners will not eliminated in this episode.
{| class="wikitable"
|+Quickfire Challenge Results
|-
!Result
!Contestants
|-
| align="center" style="background:limegreen;"|WIN
|Chef May
|-
| align="center" style="background:cornflowerblue;"|HIGH
|Chef Ooy
|-
| align="center"| IN
|Chef Pong, Chef Nui, Chef Max, Chef Gig, Chef Nam Fon, Chef Ton, Chef Bus, Chef Tam
|-
| align="center" style="background:tomato;"|LOW
|Chef Folk, Chef Tui, Chef Hooto
|}

Elimination Challenge
The 13 chefs were divided into four teams to create two dishes with 4 ingredients include, Taraba king crab, Lobster, Matsusaka beef, and Foie gras.
{| class="wikitable"
|+Elimination Challenge Results
|-
!Result
!Teams
!Contestants
|-
| align="center" style="background:limegreen;"|WIN
|Team Orange
|Chef Bus, Chef Nui, Chef Tam
|-
| align="center" style="background:cornflowerblue;"|HIGH
|Team Green
|Chef Folk, Chef Hooto, Chef Ton
|-
| align="center" style="background:tomato;"|LOW
|Team Red
|Chef Max, Chef Tui, Chef Nam Fon, Chef May
|-
| align="center" style="background:tomato;"|LOW
|Team Black
|Chef Pong, Chef Gig, Chef Ooy
|}

Episode 3
Quickfire Challenge 
The 12 chefs were divided into four teams to compete in a mise en place relay race in which each to create a dish. The winner will not eliminated in this episode.
{| class="wikitable"
|+Quickfire Challenge Results
|-
!Result
!Teams
!Contestants
|-
| align="center" style="background:limegreen;"|WIN
|Team Red
|Chef Nam Fon, Chef Tam, Chef Max
|-
| align="center" |IN
|Team Green
|Chef Nui, Chef Folk, Chef Ooy
|-
| align="center" |IN
|Team Black
|Chef Hooto, Chef May, Chef Tui
|-
| align="center" style="background:orange;"|DSQ
|Team Blue
|Chef Ton, Chef Gig, Chef Bus
|}

Elimination Challenge
The chefs created a dish with Thai barbecue ingredients and used Thai barbecue pan only.
{| class="wikitable"
|+Elimination Challenge Results
|-
!Result
!Contestants
|-
| align="center" style="background:limegreen;"|WIN
|Chef Nam Fon
|-
| align="center" style="background:cornflowerblue;"|HIGH
|Chef Hooto, Chef Bus, Chef Gig, Chef Tam, Chef May
|-
| align="center"| IN
|Chef Max
|-
| align="center" style="background:tomato;"|LOW
|Chef Folk, Chef Nui, Chef Ton, Chef Tui, Chef Ooy
|}

Episode 4
Elimination Challenge : Top Chef Marathon
Round 1: Basil
The chefs created a dish with thai basil. The winner will rest in next round.
{| class="wikitable"
|+Round 1 Results
|-
!Result
!Contestants
|-
| align="center" style="background:limegreen;"|WIN
|Chef Gig
|-
| align="center" style="background:cornflowerblue;"|HIGH
|Chef Tam, Chef Ooy, Chef May
|-
| align="center" |IN
|Chef Tui, Chef Folk, Chef Max, Chef Hooto, Chef Nam Fon, Chef Ton, Chef Bus
|}
Round 2: Survival Kit
The 10 chefs divided into four teams to create a dish with ingredients in survival kit include, instant noodle, canned fish, jasmine rice, pickle, Nam phrik (Thai chili dipping sauce), chicken fried with garlic, and instant chocolate drink. The winner will rest in next round.
{| class="wikitable"
|+Round 2 Results
|-
!Result
!Teams
!Contestants
|-
| align="center" style="background:limegreen;"|WIN
|Team Blue
|Chef Tui, Chef Hooto
|-
| align="center" style="background:cornflowerblue;"|HIGH
|Team Grey
|Chef Tam, Chef Max
|-
| align="center" |IN
|Team Black
|Chef May, Chef Folk
|-
| align="center" |IN
|Team Green
|Chef Ooy, Chef Ton
|-
| align="center" |IN
|Team Red
|Chef Nam Fon, Chef Tui
|}

Episode 5
Elimination Challenge : Top Chef Marathon
Round 3: Tear
The chefs created a dish with concept "Tear". The winner will rest in next round. The worst chef will eliminated in this round.
{| class="wikitable"
|+Round 3 Results
|-
!Result
!Contestants
|-
| align="center" style="background:limegreen;"|WIN
|Chef Ton
|-
| align="center" style="background:cornflowerblue;"|HIGH
|Chef Tam, Chef May
|-
| align="center" |IN
|Chef Folk, Chef Max, Chef Nam Fon, Chef Bus
|-
| align="center" style="background:tomato;"|LOW
|Chef Tui, Chef Ooy
|}

Round 4: Fruit
The chefs created a dish with fruits. The winner will rest in next round. The worst chef will eliminated in this round.
{| class="wikitable"
|+Round 4 Results
|-
!Result
!Contestants
|-
| align="center" style="background:limegreen;"|WIN
|Chef May
|-
| align="center" style="background:cornflowerblue;"|HIGH
|Chef Tam, Chef Ooy
|-
| align="center" |IN
|Chef Nam Fon, Chef Bus
|-
| align="center" style="background:tomato;"|LOW
|Chef Folk, Chef Max
|}

Round 5: Last dish
The chefs created a dish with concept "Last dish". The winner will rest in next round. The worst chef will eliminated in this round.
{| class="wikitable"
|+Round 5 Results
|-
!Result
!Contestants
|-
| align="center" style="background:limegreen;"|WIN
|Chef Tam
|-
| align="center" style="background:cornflowerblue;"|HIGH
|Chef Nam Fon
|-
| align="center" style="background:tomato;"|LOW
|Chef Ooy, Chef Bus, Chef Max
|}

Episode 6
Quickfire Challenge 
The 8 chefs created the monochrome dish, the color must from the ingredients. The winner will not eliminated in this episode.
{| class="wikitable"
|+Quickfire Challenge Results
|-
!Result
!Colors
!Contestants
|-
| align="center" style="background:limegreen;"|WIN
|White
|Chef May
|-
| align="center" style="background:cornflowerblue;"|HIGH
|Green
|Chef Bus
|-
| align="center" |IN
||Red
|Chef Tam, Chef Hooto
|-
| align="center" |IN
||Orange
|Chef Gig, Chef Ooy
|-
| align="center" |IN
|Green
|Chef Ton
|-
| align="center" |IN
|White
|Chef Nam Fon
|}

Episode 7

Episode 8

Episode 9

Episode 10

Episode 11

Episode 12

Episode 13

Summaries

Elimination Table

 The contestant was winning elimination challenge for the episode.
 Team / Contestants nominated in elimination challenge but not win for the episode.
 The contestant was at risk of elimination.
 The contestant was eliminated from the competition in elimination challenge.
 The contestant was eliminated from the competition in quickfire challenge.
 The contestant who have been granted immunity. Not eliminated that week.
 The contestant was originally eliminated but returned to the competition.
 The contestant was a Runner-Up.
 The contestant won Top Chef Thailand.

Notes
  Green team has members as follows: Chef Hooto, Chef Gig, Chef Nam Fon, Chef Max and Chef Ton.
 Since episode 2, no contestants have been eliminated in the quickfire challenge.
  In episode 7 Chef Tam who have been granted immunity and granted a special joint committee to review foods in elimination challenge.
  In episode 8 Chef Bus who have been granted immunity and increase the cooking time to 10 minutes.

References

External links 
 Facebook

Thailand, Season 1
2017 Thai television seasons